Saheed Laxman Nayak Medical College and Hospital , also popularly known as S.L.N Medical College & Hospital, Koraput, is a government medical college and hospital located in Koraput, Odisha, India. The hospital has its roots in a dispensary established in 1908. The college was inaugurated in 2017. It is the 4th Government Medical College opened in Odisha. It was inaugurated by Hon CM Shri Naveen Patnaik on 4 September 2017. It is the first medical college established in KBK Area.

History
The hospital has its roots in a dispensary established in Koraput district in 1908. It was upgraded to a hospital in 1937 and moved to its present building in 2004. In 2007 it was renamed after freedom fighter Laxman Nayak and inaugurated as a medical college in 2017, the first such college to be inaugurated in Odisha since the MKCG Medical College and Hospital in 1962, and the fourth government run institute in the state.A fully functional gymnasium is there for gym freaks. For sports enthusiasts this is the only medical College which has an indoor badminton court.

Affiliations
The college is affiliated with the Berhampur University and is recognized by the National Medical Commission.

References

Medical colleges in Odisha
Universities and colleges in Odisha
Educational institutions established in 2017
2017 establishments in Odisha